Ultimate Waylon Jennings is a compilation album by American country music artist Waylon Jennings. It was released by RCA Nashville on March 23, 2004. The album peaked at number 16 on the Billboard Top Country Albums chart.  The album has sold 754,000 copies in the United States as of October 2017.

Track listing

Chart performance

References

2004 compilation albums
Waylon Jennings albums
RCA Records compilation albums